Piletocera hadesialis is a moth in the family Crambidae. It was described by George Hampson in 1907. It is found in Malaysia.

References

hadesialis
Moths described in 1907
Taxa named by George Hampson
Moths of Malaysia